Hendra Aprida Gunawan (born 6 April 1982) is a badminton player from Indonesia who affiliated with the SGS PLN Bandung.

Career 
Gunawan competes in men's doubles with Joko Riyadi. They were bronze medalists at the 2005 Asian Badminton Championships, runners-up at the 2006 Dutch Open, and bronze medalists at the 2007 Badminton at the Southeast Asian Games. At the 2007 BWF World Championships they were seeded #14 and were defeated in the third round by Guo Zhendong and Xie Zhongbo, of China, 22–20, 16–21, 21–16.

Achievements

Asian Championships 
Men's doubles

Southeast Asian Games 
Men's doubles

World Junior Championships 
Boys' doubles

Mixed doubles

Asian Junior Championships 
Boys' doubles

BWF Superseries (3 Runners-up) 
The BWF Superseries, which was launched on 14 December 2006 and implemented in 2007, is a series of elite badminton tournaments, sanctioned by the Badminton World Federation (BWF). BWF Superseries levels are Superseries and Superseries Premier. A season of Superseries consists of twelve tournaments around the world that have been introduced since 2011. Successful players are invited to the Superseries Finals, which are held at the end of each year.

Men's doubles

Mixed doubles

  BWF Superseries Finals tournament
  BWF Superseries Premier tournament
  BWF Superseries tournament

BWF Grand Prix (3 title, 12 runners-up) 
The BWF Grand Prix had two levels, the BWF Grand Prix and Grand Prix Gold. It was a series of badminton tournaments sanctioned by the Badminton World Federation (BWF) which was held from 2007 to 2017. The World Badminton Grand Prix sanctioned by International Badminton Federation (IBF) from 1983 to 2006.

Men's doubles

Mixed doubles

  BWF Grand Prix Gold tournament
  BWF & IBF Grand Prix tournament

BWF International Challenge/Series 
Men's doubles

Mixed doubles

  BWF International Challenge tournament
  BWF/IBF International Series tournament

Performance timeline

National team 
 Junior level

 Senior level

Individual competitions 
 Junior level

 Senior level

Personal life 
When he was young, he joined the SGS Bandung badminton club. His parents' names are Dedi Rustandi (father) and Siti Aminah (mother). His hobbies are football and listening music. Normally people called him Hendra.

Participation at Indonesian Team 
 2 times at Sudirman Cup (2007, 2011)
 2 times at Thomas Cup (2008, 2010)

Record against selected opponents 
Men's doubles results against World Superseries finalists, World Superseries Finals semifinalists, World Championships semifinalists, and Olympic quarterfinalists paired with:

Andrei Adistia 

  Cai Yun & Lu Kai 0–1
  Chai Biao & Hong Wei 0–1
  Lee Sheng-mu & Tsai Chia-hsin 0–1
  Mads Pieler Kolding & Mads Conrad-Petersen 0–2
  Mathias Boe & Carsten Mogensen 0–2
  Muhammad Ahsan & Hendra Setiawan 0–1
  Markis Kido & Markus Fernaldi Gideon 1–0
  Mohd Zakry Abdul Latif & Mohd Fairuzizuan Mohd Tazari 1–0

Alvent Yulianto 

  Chai Biao & Guo Zhendong 2–1
  Chai Biao & Zhang Nan 0–3
  Fu Haifeng & Cai Yun 0–3
  Guo Zhendong & Xu Chen 0–1
  Hong Wei & Shen Ye 1–0
  Fang Chieh-min & Lee Sheng-mu 1–1
  Jens Eriksen & Martin Lundgaard Hansen 0–1
  Mathias Boe & Carsten Mogensen 1–1
  Johannes Schöttler & Ingo Kindervater 2–1
  Angga Pratama & Rian Agung Saputro 1–1
  Bona Septano & Muhammad Ahsan 1–2
  Candra Wijaya & Sigit Budiarto 0–1
  Yonathan Suryatama Dasuki & Rian Sukmawan 1–0
  Hirokatsu Hashimoto & Noriyasu Hirata 3–1
  Kenichi Hayakawa & Hiroyuki Endo 1–2
  Jung Jae-sung & Lee Yong-dae 0–5
  Kim Gi-jung & Kim Sa-rang 0–1
  Ko Sung-hyun & Yoo Yeon-seong 1–4
  Chan Chong Ming & Chew Choon Eng 1–1
  Choong Tan Fook & Lee Wan Wah 1–2
  Goh V Shem & Lim Khim Wah 1–0
  Hoon Thien How & Tan Wee Kiong 1–1
  Koo Kien Keat & Tan Boon Heong 0–2
  Robert Mateusiak & Michał Łogosz 1–0
  Howard Bach & Tony Gunawan 1–0

References

External links 
 BWF Player Profile

1982 births
Living people
Sportspeople from West Java
Indonesian male badminton players
Competitors at the 2007 Southeast Asian Games
Southeast Asian Games gold medalists for Indonesia
Southeast Asian Games bronze medalists for Indonesia
Southeast Asian Games medalists in badminton
21st-century Indonesian people